The Haldwani Municipal Corporation is the civic body that governs the city of Haldwani in Uttarakhand, India.

Structure 
This corporation consists of 60 wards and is headed by a mayor who presides over a deputy mayor and 73 other corporators out of which 60 are elected directly through electoral constituencies called the wards. Another 10 are appointed by the governor of the state on recommendation of the state cabinet. And remaining four are the representatives of 3 MLAs and 1 MP who represents the city in state and central legislatures. The mayor is elected directly through a first-past-the-post voting system and the deputy mayor is elected by the corporators from among their numbers.

List of mayors of the Haldwani Municipal Corporation

References

Haldwani
Municipal corporations in Uttarakhand
Year of establishment missing